The Alexander von Humboldt Medal is awarded annually by the European Geosciences Union to scientists "who have performed research in developing regions for the benefit of people and society through which they have achieved exceptional international standing in geosciences and planetary and space sciences, defined in their widest senses".

It was established in 2006 and is named in honour of Alexander von Humboldt, the Prussian geographer.

Recipients
Source: EGU

 2006: Patricio Aceituno
 2007: Liu Tungsheng
 2008: no award
 2009: Rafael Navarro-González
 2010: Carlos A. Nobre
 2011: no award
 2012: Robin T. Clarke
 2013: no award
 2014: Pradeep Mujumdar
 2015: Hubert H. G. Savenije
 2016: Jean W. A. Poesen
 2017: Johan Bouma
 2018: Filippo Giorgi
 2020: Bojie Fu
 2021:

See also
List of geophysicists
List of geophysics awards
List of prizes named after people

References

Awards established in 2006
Awards of the European Geosciences Union
Geophysics awards